Kristian Halken (born 3 April 1955) is a Danish actor. He appeared in more than sixty films since 1981.

Selected filmography

References

External links
 

1955 births
Living people
People from Horsens
Danish male film actors
Danish male television actors
20th-century Danish male actors
21st-century Danish male actors